Mattigatti is a village in Dharwad district of Karnataka, India.

Demographics 
As of the 2011 Census of India there were 608 households in Mattigatti and a total population of 2,908 consisting of 1,483 males and 1,425 females. There were 342 children ages 0-6.

References

Villages in Dharwad district